The Gypsy and the Gentleman is a 1958 British costume drama film directed by Joseph Losey. It stars Melina Mercouri and Keith Michell.

Plot
The beautiful and fiery gypsy Belle (Melina Mercouri) marries Regency playboy Sir Paul Deverill (Keith Michell) for his money. Unbeknownst to her he has squandered his fortune and is desperately in debt. When Deverill's sister Sarah (June Laverick) inherits a fortune, the couple's frustrated plots to steal it from her lead to their eventual demise.

Cast

Production
The male lead was meant to be played by Michael Craig who went to meet with Losey and felt the director "treated me like an idiot." Craig refused to play the role, and was replaced by Keith Michell.

Critical reception
Derek Winnert wrote, "The movie is hardly director Losey’s usual cup of tea, but he tries to get some bite into the gold-digger themes and the 18th century rural England period setting. And the whirlwind Mercouri acts up a storm, certainly ringing that Belle loud and clear."

References

External links

1958 films
Films directed by Joseph Losey
Films shot at Pinewood Studios
British historical films
1950s historical films
Films about Romani people
1950s English-language films
1950s British films